Liselotte Welskopf-Henrich (born Elisabeth Charlotte Henrich and identified in some sources simply as Elisabeth Charlotte Welskopf: 15 September 1901 – 16 June 1979) was a German novelist and historian of the classical period.  As a writer she concerned herself with two distinct cultures:  that of Ancient Greece and that of the "North American Indians" (as they would have been generally known when Welskopf-Henrich was working).   As an East German academic she was an influential authority on Ancient Greece.   Away from the university she wrote novels concerned with the North American Indians which became classics of East German children's literature.

At the age of 10 she wrote a long letter to the Mexican president, urging him to proceed with greater humanity against Yaqui insurgents.

Life
Liselotte Henrich was born in Munich, the child of Rudolf Henrich, a liberal-leaning lawyer, and his wife, born Marie Bernbeck.   In 1907 the family moved to Stuttgart, where Liselotte first attended school, and in 1913 they relocated again, now to Berlin.   At school she followed a humanist curriculum, passing her school final exams (Abitur) in 1921 as a pupil at the Augusts-Victoria Lyceum.   While still at school she decided to become a writer and historian.   As a child her leisure pursuits included mountaineering in the Alps.   On leaving school she studied Economics, Ancient History, Jurisprudence and Philosophy at the Frederick-William University (as the "Humboldt" was then known) in Berlin.   She received her doctorate in 1925 for a piece of work on the organisation of the international shoe trade.   The "cum magna laude" citation she received for her doctorate supported the urgings of one of her supervisors, Ulrich Wilcken, that she should progress to a habilitation (higher academic qualification) which would have opened the conventional route to an academic career, but the inflation of the early 1920s had left the family finances in no position to support a further period of study.   Starting in 1925 she was employed as a statistician in the private sector, before switching to the public sector in 1928.   Her father died in 1926.   She worked in Berlin as a government statistician between 1928 and 1945.

In 1938 she began to participate in resistance activity, which led her to the Confessing Church.   As the realities of the government-mandated Shoah became apparent, she supported persecuted Jews and concentration camp inmates with food and medicaments.   One victim of Nazi persecution whom she was able to hide from the authorities in her Berlin apartment during 1944/45 was a Communist called , whom she would later marry.   Although the precise nature and extent of her resistance activity remain unclear, some details are summarized in her novel "Jan und Jutta", published in 1953.   In 1944 she was interrogated by the Gestapo but not arrested.

War ended in May 1945, leaving a large region surrounding Berlin administered as the Soviet occupation zone.   She remained in what would later become known as East Berlin.  Between May 1945 and July 1946 Welskopf-Henrich worked as a senior secretary with the city administration, based at Berlin-Charlottenburg.   In 1946/47 she took on a leadership position with "Baustoff-Ost GmbH", a building materials organisation.   Through the immediate postwar years much of her work was focused on questions involving economic planning.

In 1946 she joined the Communist Party (KPD). Although she remained uncritical of party rule, in the words of one commentator she was in the first instance not so much a communist as a "friend of the people" ("....in erster Linie nicht Kommunistin, vielmehr Menschenfreundin"). Her joining the Communist Party may also have been related to her marriage to Rudolf Welskopf whose (second) wife she became on 11 May 1946, and who had been a Communist Party member since 1930.

In April 1946, following the merger that resulted in the creation of the new Socialist Unity Party ("Sozialistische Einheitspartei Deutschlands" / SED), Liselotte Welskopf-Henrich was one of the hundreds of thousands of Communist Party members in the Soviet zone who lost no time in signing their party membership across to what rapidly developed to become the ruling party in a new kind of one-party dictatorship.   Membership of the SED in 1946 reflected a widespread commitment to the construction of an antifascist democratic society in Germany, a society without exploitation, repression or race-based hatred, committed to social justice and peace.   At the time this went hand in hand with a lifelong involvement with Marxism.   In order better to inform herself, around this time she voluntarily attended level 1 evening classes in Marxism–Leninism.

The Welskopf-Henrich's son, Rudolf, was born in 1948.

In 1949 Liselotte Welskopf-Henrich applied to join a scheduled course in Ancient History at the Humboldt University of Berlin.   Despite her background as a government economist, she was accepted.   Between 1952 and 1960 she was employed as a research assistant at the Humboldt, and was mandated to supervise lectures.   She received hr habilitation in 1959 for work on the theme of Leisure as a Problem in the Lives and Thoughts of the Hellenes, from Homer to Aristotle.   Intriguingly, the dissertation which she had originally intended to submit was rejected because of its poor quality.   It had been based on a collection  of quotations from Marx, Engels, Lenin and Stalin on ancient history.   The rejected dissertation was nevertheless later published.   It is apparent from the rejected text that when she submitted it Welskopf-Heinrich had already moved on from a Stalinist standpoint.   Her son, writing much later in the foreword to an edition of "Bertholds neue Welt", another book of hers that was published only posthumously, identified the 1956 Soviet invasion of Hungary as a turning point in his mother's ideological position, although her analytical mindset ensured that even before this she was unable to be as uncritical of Soviet-style state "socialism" as her husband.

In January 1960 the Humboldt gave her a lectureship and in October 1960 a professorship in Ancient History.   A year later she became the head of the Ancient History department at the Humboldt's General Historical Institute.   In June 1964 she became the first woman to be elected a full member of the German Academy of Sciences.   In 1966 Welskopf formally retired.   She nevertheless retained charge of her university department till 1968 because her intended successor, Johannes Mathwich, had not yet received his anticipated doctorate.
{{Quote box|bgcolor=#FFDEAD|align=right|width=45%|"You are dangerous because you are a journalist, even though you probably have endearing and valuable qualities as a private individual.  And I know very well that your [western] newspaper prefers to write about opposition figures when you write about East German writers.   I am not an opposition figure.   Of course I'm not a member of the "East German National Council" - an utterly fictitious rumour - any more than I'm a member of the Oglala tribe.   I have always been politically engaged, but I am no kind of "organisation woman".   I'm a comrade.   And I'm tough.   I'm unbelievably tough.   Like a cat."

"Sie sind gefährlich, denn Sie sind Journalist, auch wenn Sie privat ganz schätzenswerte Charaktereigenschaften haben mögen. Und Ihre Zeitung schreibt am liebsten über Oppositionelle, wenn sie über DDR-Schriftsteller schreibt, ich weiß schon. Das bin ich aber nicht, oppositionell. Natürlich bin ich nicht Mitglied des Staatsrats, ein frei erfundenes Gerücht, wie ich auch nicht Angehörige des Oglala-Stamms bin. Politisch engagiert war ich immer, allerdings kein Organisation man. Ich bin Genossin, Und ich bin zäh, ich bin ganz unglaublich zäh, wie eine Katze."

}}
After her retirement from the university Welskopf launched herself into a new project, which concerned the Greek "polis".   Her approach was probably unique.   It was structured neither as a conventional East German academic project, nor as a West German equivalent.   Instead, she funded it herself and worked on it supported by 60 academics from both East and West Germany along with researchers from other countries.   The result was published in four volumes in 1974 as "Die Hellenistische Polis – Krise – Wandlung – Wirkung" ("The Hellenistic Polis - Crisis - Transformation - Functioning").   She followed up with an even more ambitious project, classifying social classes in Ancient Greece, using inputs by around 100 contributors from 40 countries.   This appeared posthumously in seven volumes between 1981 and 1985.

Welskopf-Henrich's academic standing meant that she was able to travel abroad.   Her son writes of regular family holiday trips to Hungary after 1956 and to Czechoslovakia after 1968.   As her books became more popular at home and her international reputation also grew she was even able to travel beyond the confines of Soviet sponsored fraternal socialism.   Between 1963 and 1974 Welskopf-Henrich undertook a succession of trips to the United States and to Canada in order to study the lives and traditions of the Dakota "Indians".   The scholarly care which enabled her to replace popular stereotypes with a more "human face" for the North American indigenous peoples led to her being honoured with the soubriquet "Lakota-Tashina" (literally: "protective cover of the Lakota").

On 16 June 1979 Liselotte Welskopf-Henrich died suddenly in Garmisch-Partenkirchen, close to the mountains where she had spent her holidays as a child.   She was 77.   She had been predeceased by her husband earlier that year.   They are buried together in Berlin-Köpenick.

"Belletristic" Works
Applying academic discipline, Liselotte Welskopf-Henrich's "North American Indian" novels were able to appeal to an intellectually minded readership by combining research based context with imagination driven plots, targeted in the first instance on younger readers.   She also composed the original filmscript for the 1966 The Sons of Great Bear film adaption of her first novel of the same name published in 1951. Die Söhne der Großen Bärin ("Sons of the Great Bear") - the DEFA film, starring Gojko Mitić, turned out to be the first in a long and successful series of films on the "North American Indian" theme.   Her "North American Indian"  quintet "Das Blut des Adlers" ("Blood of the Eagle") was also extremely popular in the German Democratic Republic.

Her novel "Zwei Freunde" ("Two Friends") concerned the Weimar Republic and the early manifestations of Nazism.  The book was actually written in 1943. "Jan und Jutta" was in most respects an autobiographical account of her own experiences (as "Jutta") and those of the man who later became her husband (as "Jan") during the final years of the Second World War. She intended to continue the series with her postwar work "Bertolds neue Welt" ("Bertold's new world"), but abandoned that idea.   She probably sensed that her critical perspective of developments in the German Democratic Republic would make such books unsuitable for publication.   "Bertolds neue Welt" was eventually published only in 2015.

In 1954 her story "Der Bergführer" ("The Mountain Guide") was published in Leipzig by Mitteldeutscher Verlag. It concerned Karl Unteregger, a young mountain guide working in the Dolomites in 1939.  The narrative deals with nazism but also captures the dramatic mountain landscape. Its publication scheduled for 1950, the story had to be changed for political reasons, which led to historical discrepancies. The book met with little success at the time, and it was only in 2015 that it was reissued, now faithful to the original manuscript.

Awards and honours
 1951 First prize for youth literature from the German Democratic Republic for Die Söhne der Großen Bärin 1958 Patriotic Order of Merit
 1961 Patriotic Order of Merit
 1966 Banner of Labor
 1968 Friedrich Gerstäcker prize for Die Söhne der Großen Bärin''
 1972 National Prize of the German Democratic Republic 3rd class
 1974 Hervorragender Wissenschaftler des Volkes

References

Scholars of ancient Greek history
German Marxist historians
Academic staff of the Humboldt University of Berlin
East German writers
Writers from Berlin
German resistance members
Recipients of the Patriotic Order of Merit
Recipients of the Banner of Labor
Communist Party of Germany members
Socialist Unity Party of Germany members
1901 births
1979 deaths
Members of the German Academy of Sciences at Berlin
East German women
People from East Berlin